The 1971 Boise State Broncos football team represented Boise State College during the 1971 NCAA College Division football season, the fourth season of Bronco football (at the four-year level) and the second as members of the Big Sky Conference and NCAA. In the College Division (now Division II), they played their home games on campus at Bronco Stadium 

Boise State opened the season with a stunning 42–14 upset of Idaho in the first meeting between the two teams, creating an instant rivalry game. This was actually an Idaho "home game" moved to Boise, because their new stadium in Moscow was not completed.  of the University Division, Idaho had frequently played one home game per season in Boise in the old wooden Bronco Stadium (and its predecessors) from 1920 through 1968; this ended when Boise State joined the Big Sky. Despite the opening loss, Idaho won the conference title in 1971, as the Broncos lost twice on the road.

Knap was named coach of the year in the West for the College Division.

Schedule

 The opener was a home game for Idaho, but played at Bronco Stadium; their new Idaho Stadium in Moscow opened in October

Camellia Bowl
Invited for the first time to the eight-team postseason in the College Division, Boise State accepted a bid to play Chico State in the Camellia Bowl in Sacramento, California.  The teams last met in the season opener in 1970, the first-ever game in Bronco Stadium. Boise State was ranked seventh in the final small college poll, released by the Associated Press in late November.

The game included a wager between the respective governors of the two states, Cecil Andrus of Idaho and Ronald Reagan of California. The bet was for three-day vacations, at either Sun Valley in central Idaho or Disneyland in southern California.

Reagan invited the Chico State team to his office the day before the game and encouraged the Wildcats to go out and win for the state of California. Although a neutral site game, Chico State only had to travel  from its campus.

After a scoreless first quarter, Chico State had a 14–0 lead at halftime, and was ahead by three touchdowns after three quarters. Led by quarterback (and placekicker) Eric Guthrie, Boise State outscored the Wildcats 25–0 in the final period to win  This was the extent of the postseason in the College Division; after the final poll in late November, four regional bowls (quarterfinals) were played in mid-December. A full tournament was initiated in 1973 with the introduction of Division II.

It was later revealed that Guthrie had signed a professional baseball contract with the Pittsburgh Pirates organization five years earlier in 1966. The NCAA had Boise State return the winner's trophy and $18,000, its share of the gate and other receipts.

NFL Draft
Two Broncos were selected in the 1972 NFL Draft, which lasted seventeen rounds (442 selections).

References

Boise State
Boise State Broncos football seasons
Boise State Broncos football